The Wellheim Formation is a geological formation in southern Germany deposited during the Cenomanian to earliest Turonian stages of the Upper Cretaceous.

The Formation is subdivided into three member units: unnamed basal marine sandstone, the Neuburg Kieselerde Member, and an upper silicified conglomerate (Homsand facies).Geographically, this formation is located in the central southernmost part of the Franconian Jura, on the left bank of the Danube, roughly between the towns of Wellheim and Neuburg in Bavaria.The formation is commercially quarried for siliceous earth, which has a variety of applications.

Stratigraphy 
The formation infills karstic voids found in Upper Jurassic limestones. Its upper contact is with either Miocene Upper Freshwater Molasse clays and marls or Pleistocene glacial deposits while the lower contact is with the Jurassic limestones, or the Lower Cretaceous Schutzfels Formation, a terrestrial unit which also infills the karstic terrain.

Depositional Environment 
The Wellheim Formation was formed in a quiet water environment by deposition of pelagic sediments into a number of submerged karsts in the ocean floor over several million years.  Wilmsen et al (2010) identified the primary sediment composition as sandy and spiculitic sediments, with notably little terrigenous input.It has since been classified as an Opoka type marine deposit, a term that is primarily used to refer to Upper Cretaceous sponge spicule rich siliceous limestones found in Poland and western Ukraine.

Lüttig (2007) called the scientific view of the formation of the Neuburg Kieselerde Member "contested" however that position has not been supported by subsequent authors.

Fossils 
The Wellheim Formation is fossiliferous with the Neuburg Kieselerde Member having one of the most diverse invertebrate assemblages in the Danubian Cretaceous Group. Schneider et al. (2013) mapped fossil yielding localities associated with this member in a rough triangle between Wellheim, Rennertshofen and Neuburg.

Age and correlation 
It was deposited between about 93 to 98 million years ago during the Cenomanian, the lowest stage of the Upper Cretaceous.
The index fossil associated with these sediments is Inoceramus crippsi, a wing-shaped (pteriomorph) salt-water bivalve.

Commercial exploitation 

Mining of Neuburg Kieselerde Member sediments takes place at an industrial scale around Neuburg an der Donau. The products are marketed under the umbrella term siliceous earth. The sediment is used as a filler material, an abrasive and polishing medium, a paint and varnish additive and as a nutritional supplement.

It is generally composed of silicic acid (80 percent by weight or less) and kaolinite.

In 2015, 55,000 tons of the purified material were produced. This required the open-pit mining of 120,000 tons of raw siliceous earth.

The producer has claimed a non-biogenic, mineral origin for their product, while most other sources assert a biogenic origin for the material.
Substances called siliceous earths are usually defined as having a biogenic origin, with material of a similar composition usually being termed diatomaceous earth.

The producer also has repeatedly claimed a unique "one-of-a-kind worldwide" status of their product, but Lüttig refuted this in 2007 for the material that is produced, saying that several similar material deposits are known, naming Heiligenhafen Kieselgestein as an example. On the other hand he agreed that the very special formation circumstances could indeed be called unique.

It has historically been used for the production of glass, ceramics and color pigments like ultramarine.

Notes

References

Sources

Further reading 

 
 
 
 
 
 

Fossiliferous stratigraphic units of Europe
Geologic formations of Germany
Cretaceous Germany
Sedimentary rocks
Cenomanian Stage
Turonian Stage
Upper Cretaceous Series of Europe